Cho Minhaeng is a South Korean scientist in researching physical chemistry, spectroscopy, and microscopy. He was director of the National Creative Research Initiative Center for Coherent Multidimensional Spectroscopy and is founding director of the Center for Molecular Spectroscopy and Dynamics in the Institute for Basic Science (IBS), located in Korea University.

Education 
Majoring in chemistry, Cho Minhaeng received both his B.S. and M.S. from Seoul National University in 1987 and 1989, respectively. He then studied in the University of Chicago where he majored in physical chemistry while at the same time was working there as a research assistant. Supervised by Professor Graham Fleming, he gained his Ph.D. in 1993.

Career 
During the first year of his Ph.D. studies, Cho was a visiting scientist at the University of Rochester for several months. He repeated this at the Institute for Molecular Science (IMS) in Japan in 1992 and at Brown University in 1993. He returned to IMS in 1993 as a visiting scientist and in 1997 as a visiting professor. After obtaining his Ph.D., Cho did a two-year postdoc under Professor Robert J. Silbey from 1994 to 1996 at MIT. He returned to Korea in 1996 as an assistant professor in the Department of Chemistry, College of Science at Korea University. He became an associate professor in 1999, a full professor in 2003, and from 2005 to 2008 was the Hyundai-Kia Motor Professor.

In 2002, Cho was the chairman of the 1st International Conference on Multidimensional Vibrational Spectroscopy, held at Korea University. He was a member of the International Cooperation Committee, Korea Chemical Society from 2003 to 2006. He directed the National Creative Research Initiative Center for Coherent Multidimensional Spectroscopy from 2000 to 2009. He became director of the IBS Center for Molecular Spectroscopy and Dynamics, established in December 2014. In 2016, Choi Wonshik joined the Center as an associate director and head of the Super-depth Imaging Lab.

Cho's research group actively studies nonlinear optical and vibrational spectroscopy, molecular dynamics simulations of chemical and biological systems in condensed phases, quantum dynamics of chemical reactions, linear and nonlinear chiroptical spectroscopy of biomolecules, quantum spectroscopy and imaging with high-precision laser technology, interferometric measurements of scattering fields for single particle tracking, chemically sensitive spectroscopy and imaging, surface-specific spectroscopy, and ultrafast vibrational microspectroscopy.

Membership
 2010: Member, Korean Academy of Science and Technology
 2002-2009: Junior Member, Korean Academy of Science and Technology 
 1996–present: Permanent Member, Korean Chemical Society
 1996–present: Member, American Chemical Society

Journal Editorial Board Member
 2019–present: Editorial Advisory Board, Applied Sciences
 2019–present: Editorial Advisory Board, The Journal of Physical Chemistry A
 2016–present: Editorial Advisory Board, Spectrochimica Acta Part A
 2016–present: Editorial Advisory Board, Biomedical Spectroscopy and Imaging
 2015-2017: Editorial Advisory Board: The Journal of Chemical Physics
 2013–present: Editorial Advisory Board, Chirality
 2010-2011: Academic Editor, AIP Advances
 2007–present: Editorial Advisory Board, Chemical Physics
 2000-2003: Editorial Advisory Board, PhysChemComm

Honors and awards
 2019: Seok-Top Lecturer, Korea University
 2018: Seok-Top Lecturer, Korea University
 2017: Seok-Top Lecturer, Korea University
 2017: Physical Chemistry Award, Korean Chemical Society
 2013: Seok-Top Lecturer, Korea University
 2012: Seok-Top Lecturer, Korea University
 2012: National Academy of Science Award
 2012: 100 Who Will Shine on Korea in 10 Years, Dong-A Ilbo
 2011: Korean Academy of Science and Technology Award
 2010: 100 Representatives of Excellence, Korea Research Foundation
 2010: Kyung-Ahm Prize, Kyung-Ahm Foundation
 2009: Scientist of the Month, National Research Foundation of Korea
 2009: Seok-Top Lecturer, Korea University
 2005: 50 Representatives of Excellence, Korea Research Foundation
 2000: Young Scholar Award, Pacifichem, American Chemical Society
 2000: Shonan Lecturer The Graduate University for Advanced Studies, Hayama, Japan
 1999: British Chevening Award, British Council, Seoul, Korea
 1999: Young Scientist Award, Korean Academy of Science and Technology
 1995: Nobel Laureate Signature Award, American Chemical Society
 1994: Marc P. Galler Prize, University of Chicago
 1992: William R. Harper Fellowship, University of Chicago
 1989-1992: Korean Government Scholarship, Korean Ministry of Education

References

External links 
 IBS Center for Molecular Spectroscopy and Dynamics, Korea University
 Google Scholar page

South Korean chemists
Living people
1965 births
Institute for Basic Science
Seoul National University alumni
University of Chicago alumni
Academic staff of Korea University